Mažice is a municipality and village in Tábor District in the South Bohemian Region of the Czech Republic. It has about 100 inhabitants. The historic centre of the village is well preserved and is protected by law as a village monument reservation.

References

Villages in Tábor District